Westside is an unincorporated community in Catoosa County, in the U.S. state of Georgia.

Etymology
Westside was named due to its location in the western part of Catoosa County.

References

Unincorporated communities in Catoosa County, Georgia
Unincorporated communities in Georgia (U.S. state)